Tectiliviricetes (from tectivirid-like) is a class of viruses.

Taxonomy
The class contains the following orders:

 Belfryvirales
 Kalamavirales
 Rowavirales
 Vinavirales

Additionally, one family is unassigned to an order: Autolykiviridae.

References

Viruses